National Union of Nigerian Students (NUNS) was a students' union bringing together Nigerian students both within Nigeria and across the diaspora.

NUNS was founded in 1956, following structural changes in the West African Students' Union. It brought together student councils in Ife, Zaria, and Nsukka.

In April 1978, Nigerian students were faced with the imposition of increased fees, and NUNS participated in a series of Campus protests across the whole of Nigeria known as the  Ali Must Go protests. The government responded by sending in the army and police, leading to the death or serious wounding of over twenty students. Three universities were closed and NUNS was banned. Several university staff and students were dismissed.

Each president of the association has a tenure of 1 year and the current president elected on the 4th of September is Umar Faruq Lawal

References

Student organizations established in 1956
Students' unions in Nigeria